Ilioparsis is a genus of moth in the family Lecithoceridae. It contains the species Ilioparsis effulgens, which is found in Nepal.

References

Natural History Museum Lepidoptera genus database

Lecithocerinae
Monotypic moth genera